Bassala is a surname. Notable people with the surname include:

 Bassala Touré (born 1976), Malian footballer
 Bassala Sambou (born 1997), English footballer

Surnames of Malian origin